Jack Hobbs (1882–1963) was an English cricketer.

Jack Hobbs may also refer to:
 Jack Hobbs (actor) (1893–1968), British actor
 John Hobbs (baseball) or Jack Hobbs (born 1956), American baseball player
 Jack Hobbs (footballer) (born 1988), English footballer
 Jack Hobbs (horse) (foaled 2012), a British racehorse

See also
 John Hobbs (disambiguation)

Hobbs, Jack